Bernat de Rocafort was the third leader of the Catalan Company, from 1307 until 1309. 

Bernat was of humble birth, and probably a Valencian. Prior to 1303, he had been in command of a band of mercenaries garrisoning two castles in Calabria on behalf of King Robert of Naples. In 1303, after Robert had failed to pay him and his men, he led 200 cavalry and 1000 almogàvers to join the Catalan Company. He was soon made its seneschal (manescal de la host), replacing the late Corberán de Alet of Navarre. In August 1303, Bernat commanded the almogàvers at the Battle of Ania, while Roger de Flor commanded the cavalry.

Following the murder of Roger de Flor at the order of the Byzantine emperor Michael IX Palaiologos, the Catalans elected Berenguer d'Entença as their leader, and took over the fortress of Gallipoli as their own. Entença was soon after captured by a Genoese fleet, and Rocafort was chosen as his successor, with a council of twelve to assist him. Under Rocafort's leadership, the Catalans inflicted defeats on the Byzantines, and raided much of Thrace, plundering its cities. They were strengthened by the arrival of 3,800 Turkish auxiliaries, many of whom converts to Christianity. 

However, Rocafort's position was threatened when Entença secured his release from captivity. Upon his return, Entença was murdered by Rocafort's relatives. Rocafort also persuaded the Company to reject the overtures of King Frederick III of Sicily, who endeavoured to place the Company under his control by sending his cousin, Infante Ferdinand of Majorca, to take over their leadership. The Infante arrived in Greece, but the Catalans refused to accept him, whereupon he was forced to return to Sicily, via the Duchy of Athens; he was accompanied by the main chronicler of the Catalan Company's deeds, Ramon Muntaner. After devastating Thrace, in June 1307 the Company was forced to move west to find new sustenance. After moving through Thrace and Macedonia, the Catalans established themselves at the abandoned ancient city of Kassandreia in the Chalcidice peninsula in August. From there they continued their raids, plundering the monasteries of Mount Athos in summer 1308. 

Having effectively burned his bridges with the Crown of Aragon, and in order to strengthen his authority, Rocafort took an oath of fealty to Thibaut de Cepoy, a representative of Charles of Valois. Effective power however remained in his hands, and he soon began to envisage himself as an independent monarch, aiming at capturing Thessalonica and restoring the defunct Crusader kingdom there. He even had a royal seal made, showing Saint Demetrios, the city's patron saint, and a royal crown, and aimed to extend his dominion over the Duchy of Athens. To that end, he entered into negotiations with the childless duke, Guy II de la Roche, for a marriage with his sister, Jeannette de Brienne. Guy II sent envoys to Kassandreia, and toyed with the idea of using the Catalans to pursue his wife's claims on the neighbouring Principality of Achaea. These plans were opposed by Venice, however, who saw the Catalans as a threat to her own colonies in Greece; and the negotiations had not borne fruit when Rocafort himself was deposed by the Company, who had tired of his increasingly despotic rule.

After his dismissal, Rocafort was arrested and handed over to the ward of Cepoy. The latter, wary of staying with the Catalans any longer, absconded in the middle of night with his prisoner, and took ship to Naples. There King Robert of Naples threw Rocafort in the dungeons of Aversa, where he was left to die of hunger. In the meantime, the Catalans, enraged at the sudden departure of their leader, had a sudden change of heart, and killed the fourteen captains who had led the revolt against Rocafort. No new leader was elected in his place, partly owing to the lack of figures prominent enough to occupy such a position; instead, they elected a four-man committee, chosen equally from among the cavalry and the infantry, to lead them along the council of twelve already established.

Notes

Sources
 
 

13th-century births
Year of birth unknown
1309 deaths
14th-century condottieri
Catalan Company
People of Frankish and Latin Greece
People executed by starvation
People of the Kingdom of Naples